The 2007–08 Tour de Ski was the 2nd edition of the Tour de Ski and took place from 28 December 2007 until 6 January 2008. The race kicked off in Nové Město, the Czech Republic, and finished in Val di Fiemme, Italy, ten days later. It featured 8 top international cross-country skiing competitions, of which two were sprint events.

Women

Final standings

Overall standings

Source:

Sprint Standings
{| border="0" 
| valign="top" |

Stages

Stage 1
Prologue - December 28; 3.3 km classical, individual start;  Nové Město, Czech Republic

Stage 2 
December 29;  10 km free technique, pursuit;   Nové Město, Czech Republic

Stage 3
December 30; 1.0 km free technique, sprint;  Prague, Czech Republic

Stage 4
January 1;  10 km free technique, pursuit;   Nové Město, Czech Republic

Stage 5
January 2; 10 km classical, individual start;  Nové Město, Czech Republic

Stage 6
January 4; 1.2 km free technique, sprint;  Asiago, Italy

Stage 7
January 5; 10 km classical, mass start;  Val di Fiemme, Italy

Stage 8
Final Climb - January 6;  10 km free technique, pursuit;   Val di Fiemme, Italy

Men

Final standings

Overall standings

Sprint Standings

Stages

Stage 1
Prologue - December 28;  4.5 km classical, individual start;   Nové Město, Czech Republic

Stage 2
December 29;  15 km free technique, pursuit;   Nové Město, Czech Republic

Stage 3
December 30;  1.2 km free technique, sprint;   Prague, Czech Republic

Stage 4
January 1;  15 km free technique, pursuit;   Nové Město, Czech Republic

Stage 5
January 2;  15 km classical, individual start;   Nové Město, Czech Republic

Stage 6
January 4;  1.2 km free technique, sprint;   Asiago, Italy

Stage 7
January 5;  20 km classical, mass start;   Val di Fiemme, Italy

Stage 8
Final Climb - January 6;  10 km free technique, pursuit;   Val di Fiemme, Italy

References

External links

Tour de Ski by year
Tour de Ski
Tour de Ski 2007-08
Tour de Ski 2007-08